Baria is a village in Chittagong Division, Bangladesh.

References

Populated places in Chittagong Division